Faruki or Farukî is a Turkish surname. Notable people with the surname include:

 Kemal Faruki (1910–1988), Turkish footballer
 Nermin Farukî (1904–1991), Turkish sculptor

See also
 Farooqi, Arabic cognate

Turkish-language surnames